Trench Crossing railway station was a station in Trench, Shropshire, England. The station was opened in 1849 and closed in 1964.

The line was lifted following closure but was relaid in the late 2000s as a single track to serve the Telford International Freight Park at Donnington.

References

Further reading

Disused railway stations in Shropshire
Railway stations in Great Britain opened in 1854
Railway stations in Great Britain closed in 1964
Former London and North Western Railway stations
Beeching closures in England